Visitors to Solomon Islands must obtain a visa unless they come from one of the visa exempt countries or countries whose citizens are eligible for permit issued on arrival. All visitors must hold a passport valid for 6 months.

Visa policy map

Visa policy 
Visa-free access
Nationals of the following 32 countries are visa exempt for visits up to 3 months (unless otherwise noted):

Free Visitor Permit on arrival
Citizens of the following 42 countries and territories may obtain a free permit valid for 3 months within any year period on arrival:

Citizens of all other countries and territories except the following can obtain a visa on arrival if they have a pre-arranged visa approval:

Statistics

Most visitors arriving to Solomon Islands were from the following countries:

See also

Visa requirements for Solomon Islands citizens

References

External links
Immigration Requirements of Solomon Islands

Foreign relations of the Solomon Islands
Solomon Islands